Desperate Trails is a 1939 American Western film directed by Albert Ray. It was the first of a series of 28 films by Universal Pictures with Brown in the lead role.

Cast 
Johnny Mack Brown - Steve Hayden
Bob Baker - Clem Waters
Fuzzy Knight - Cousin Willie Strong
Frances Robinson - Judith Lantry
Russell Simpson - Sheriff Big Bill Tanner
Clarence Wilson - Malenkthy Culp
Charles Stevens - Henchman Ortega
Ralph Dunn - Henchman Lon

References

External links 

1939 Western (genre) films
1939 films
American Western (genre) films
American black-and-white films
1930s American films
1930s English-language films